Paraglenea fortunei is a species of beetle in the family Cerambycidae. It was described by Saunders in 1853, originally under the genus Glenea. It is known from Taiwan, China, North Korea, South Korea, and Vietnam, and has been introduced into Japan. It feeds on Cinnamomum camphora, Boehmeria nivea, Hibiscus syriacus, Morus alba, and Triadica sebifera.

Varietas
 Paraglenea fortunei var. chloromelas Thomson, 1879
 Paraglenea fortunei var. bisbinotata Pic, 1915
 Paraglenea fortunei var. clarevittata Breuning, 1952
 Paraglenea fortunei var. cojunctofaciata Breuning, 1952
 Paraglenea fortunei var. savioi Pic, 1923
 Paraglenea fortunei var. innotaticollis Pic, 1936
 Paraglenea fortunei var. notatipennis Pic, 1914
 Paraglenea fortunei var. pubescens Pic, 1914
 Paraglenea fortunei var. soluta Ganglbauer, 1887
 Paraglenea fortunei var. unicoloripennis Breuning, 1952
 Paraglenea fortunei var. viridicollis Breuning, 1952
 Paraglenea fortunei var. fasciata Pic, 1915
 Paraglenea fortunei var. innotata Pic, 1915

References

Saperdini
Beetles described in 1853